The Anglican Diocese of Owo is one of twelve within the Anglican Province of Ondo, itself one of 14 provinces within the Church of Nigeria: the current bishop is Stephen Ayodeji Akinwale Fagbemi.

As its name implies, it is located in the town of Owo, an area with 222,000 residents.

Notes

Dioceses of the Province of Ondo
Church of Nigeria dioceses